Brongniartia is a genus of leguminous plants, first named by Kunth after the French botanist Adolphe Brongniart.

Species
Brongniartia comprises the following species:

 Brongniartia abbottiae I.M. Johnst.
 Brongniartia alamosana Rydb.

 Brongniartia argentea Rydb.
 Brongniartia argyrophylla McVaugh

 Brongniartia caeciliae Harms
 Brongniartia canescens (S. Watson) Rydb.
 Brongniartia cordata McVaugh
 Brongniartia cuneata L.B. Sm. & B.G. Schub.
 Brongniartia diffusa Rose
 Brongniartia discolor Brandegee
 Brongniartia foliolosa Hemsl.
 Brongniartia funiculata L.B. Sm. & B.G. Schub.

 Brongniartia glabrata Hook. & Arn.
 Brongniartia goldmanii Rose

 Brongniartia guerrerensis J. Jimenez Ram. & J.L. Contr.
 Brongniartia hirsuta Rydb.
 Brongniartia imitator McVaugh
 Brongniartia inconstans S. Watson
 Brongniartia intermedia Moric.

 Brongniartia luisana Brandegee
 Brongniartia lunata Rose
 Brongniartia lupinoides (Kunth) Taub.
 Brongniartia magnibracteata Schltdl.
 Brongniartia minima McVaugh
 Brongniartia minutifolia S. Watson
 Brongniartia mollicula Brandegee
 Brongniartia mollis Kunth
 Brongniartia mortonii McVaugh
 Brongniartia norrisii McVaugh
 Brongniartia nudiflora S. Watson

 Brongniartia oligosperma Baill.

 Brongniartia pacifica McVaugh

 Brongniartia paniculata Rydb.

 Brongniartia parvifolia Rose
 Brongniartia pauciflora Rydb.
 Brongniartia peninsularis Rose
 Brongniartia podalyrioides Kunth
 Brongniartia pringlei Rydb.
 Brongniartia proteranthera L.B. Sm. & B.G. Schub.

 Brongniartia revoluta Rose
 Brongniartia robinioides Kunth
 Brongniartia rozynskii Standl.
 Brongniartia seleri Harms
 Brongniartia sericea Schltdl.
 Brongniartia shrevei Wiggins
 Brongniartia sousae Dorado

 Brongniartia suberea Rose
 Brongniartia tenuifolia Standl.

 Brongniartia trifoliata Brandegee
 Brongniartia ulbrichiana Harms
 Brongniartia vazquezii Dorado
 Brongniartia vicioides M. Martens & Galeotti

References 

Brongniartieae
Fabaceae genera
Flora of North America
Flora of Central America
Flora of western South America
Taxa named by Carl Sigismund Kunth